Melica penicillaris is a species of grass in the Poaceae family.

Description
The leaf-sheaths are smooth, tubular and are closed on one end. They also have a rough and scabrous surface. Besides the pedicels, the spikelets have 2-4 fertile florets which are diminished at the apex.

Both the upper and lower glumes are keelless, membranous, oblong and have obtuse apexes. Its lemma have pilose surface, obtuse apex and either white or yellow coloured hairs. The species' palea have ciliolated keels and is 2-veined. Flowers are fleshy, oblong and truncate. They also grow together, have 2 lodicules and 3 anthers. The fruits have caryopsis with additional pericarp and linear hilum.

Ecology
Melica penicillaris blooms from May to June.

References

penicillaris
Endemic flora of Turkey
Flora of Asia
Taxa named by Pierre Edmond Boissier
Taxa named by Benjamin Balansa